Reverie may refer to:

 A daydream or a dreamy state.
 W. R. Bion's psychoanalytic use of "reverie"

Places
 Reverie, Tennessee, an unincorporated community in Tipton County, Tennessee, United States
 Reverie (Marion, Alabama), a Greek Revival mansion in Marion, Alabama, United States

Music
 Rêverie, an 1847 work for violin and piano (part of Op. 22) by Vieuxtemps
 Rêverie, an 1865 piano work by Mussorgsky
 Rêverie by Giovanni Bottesini, c. 1870
 Rêverie, a piano piece by Debussy, c. 1895
 Rêverie (Scriabin) in E minor, Op. 24, an 1898 orchestral work by Scriabin
 Rêverie, Op. 49/3, a 1905 piece for piano by Scriabin
 Reverie, a piano piece by Billy Joel
 Dumka (Reverie), an 1840 song by Chopin
 Rêverie, an art song by Reynaldo Hahn, c. 1870

Albums
 Reverie (Cherie Currie album), 2015
 Reverie (Joe Henry album), 2011
 Reverie (Ben Platt album), 2021
 Reverie (Rafael Anton Irisarri album), 2010
 Reverie (Tinashe album), 2012 
 Reverie (EP), 1982 extended play by The Triffids
 Rêveries, 1979 album by Richard Clayderman 
 Rêverie, album by Luciano Supervielle 2011

Songs
 "Reverie", a song by Arca from Arca
 "Reverie", a song by Chaz Jankel from Chas Jankel
 "Reverie", a song by Design the Skyline from Nevaeh
 "Reverie", a song by Elton John from A Single Man
 "Reverie", a song by Lacuna Coil from In a Reverie
 "Rêverie", a song by Ludovico Einaudi from Nightbook
 "La Reverie", a song by Sarah Vaughan from After Hours

Other uses
 , a painting by Pierre-Auguste Renoir
 Reverie (TV series), an American drama television series
 Reverie (video game), 2018
 The Legend of Heroes: Trails into Reverie, 2020 video game
 Reverie, an experimental short film by photographer Vincent Laforet
 Reverie, a color lithograph piece of art nouveau work, done by Alphonse Mucha in 1896

See also